Aseel al-Awadhi (born 1969) is a former member of the National Assembly of Kuwait. She was a professor of philosophy at Kuwait University before moving into politics. Al-Awadhi first stood for a seat on the National Assembly in 2008, losing the election but gaining the highest number of votes for a female candidate since women were allowed to stand. She was elected representative of Kuwait's Third District in 2009; a post that she held until 2012.

Education 

After studying philosophy at Kuwait University, al-Awadhi earned her PhD in philosophy at the University of Texas. Upon returning to Kuwait she became a professor of philosophy at Kuwait University.

Political career 

Al-Awadhi first stood in the 2008 general election as part of the National Democratic Alliance. She gained the highest number of votes received by a Kuwaiti woman since women were allowed to stand for the National Assembly in 2005, although she did not gain enough votes to win a seat. In the 2009 election she was elected as a representative for the Third District, while simultaneously becoming one of the first women to be elected to the National Assembly.

Along with fellow MP (member of parliament) Rola Dashti, Al-Awadhi chose not to wear a hijab when she took her seat in the National Assembly. This decision was criticized by Islamist MPs, including prominent Islamic Salafi Alliance member Ali al-Omair. The Constitutional Court rejected a case which claimed that refusal to wear a hijab was a violation of Kuwaiti law.

Al-Awadhi lost her seat in the February 2012, but was briefly returned to parliament after the previous parliament was dissolved by the Emir in June 2012. She chose to boycott the December 2012 election in protest of the decision to reduce the number of votes per person from four to one. She chose not to stand in the 2013 election.

References 

1969 births
Academic staff of Kuwait University
Kuwaiti women academics
Kuwaiti women in politics
21st-century women politicians
Kuwaiti people of Iranian descent
Members of the National Assembly (Kuwait)
University of Texas alumni
Living people